A layered (or "stacked") drink, sometimes called a pousse-café, is a kind of cocktail in which the slightly different densities of various liqueurs are used to create an array of colored layers, typically two to seven.  The specific gravity of the liquid ingredients increases from top to bottom.  Liqueurs with the most dissolved sugar and the least alcohol are densest and are put at the bottom.  These include fruit juices and cream liqueurs.  Those with the least water and the most alcohol, such as rum with 75% alcohol by volume, are floated on top.

These drinks are made primarily for visual enjoyment rather than taste. They are sipped, sometimes through a silver straw, one liqueur at a time. The drink must be made and handled carefully to avoid mixing; however, some layered drinks, such as shooters, are generally drunk quickly.

Preparation
The layers must be poured very gently to avoid mixing.  They can be poured over the back of a spoon or down a glass rod.

Examples of layered drinks

 Black and Tan
 Black Velvet
 Blue Eyed Blonde
 B-52
 Oatmeal Cookie
 Pousse-café (1/2 ounce Grenadine, 1/2 ounce yellow chartreuse, 1/2 ounce crème de cassis, 1/2 ounce white creme de menthe, 1/2 ounce green chartreuse, and 1/2 ounce brandy, layered in order given).
 Slippery Nipple
 Tequila Sunrise

Non-alcoholic 
Non-alcoholic beverages may also be layered, as in a latte macchiato.

See also
 Mixed drink shooters and drink shots
 List of cocktails
 Flaming beverage

References

 Tyler, S. and Herbst, R.  The Ultimate A-to-Z Bar Guide.  New York: Broadway Books, 1998.
 
DrinkStreet Pousse Cafe recipe
Bad Idea Theater - Pousse-café
Art of the Drink - Sunset Pousse-café video

Shooters (drinks)